Cetotheriopsis  is a genus of extinct cetaceans of the family Cetotheriopsidae.

Taxonomy
The type species of this genus, C. lintianus, was originally described as a species of Balaenodon (a genus of extinct sperm whale) by German paleontologist Hermann von Meyer. It was eventually recognized as distinct from the type species of Balaenodon, and it was given the new generic name Stenodon. However, it was later renamed Cetotheriopsis because Stenodon had already been used for a gastropod by Constantine Samuel Rafinesque in 1818. For his part, Pierre-Joseph van Beneden coined Aulocetus as a replacement name for Stenodon, unaware of the earlier replacement name. Since Cetotheriopsis has priority over Aulocetus and both were based on the same type species, Aulocetus is a junior objective synonym of Cetotheriopsis.

Misassigned species
Aulocetus sammarinensis was formerly assigned to this genus, but is now recognized as a distinct genus, Titanocetus. Two other species from Italy assigned to Cetotheriopsis, Aulocetus lovisati and A. calaritanus, are also generically distinct and in need of new generic names.

Aulocetus latus, known from a Tortonian-age formation in Portugal, is in need of the new generic name.

References

Baleen whales
Miocene cetaceans
Prehistoric mammals of Europe
Prehistoric cetacean genera
Fossil taxa described in 1871